The Armenian Kyokushin Karate Federation, is the regulating body of kyokushin karate in Armenia, governed by the Armenian Olympic Committee. The headquarters of the federation is located in Yerevan.

History
The Armenian Kyokushin Karate Federation was established in 2005 and is currently led by president Andranik Hakobyan. Armenian kyokushin karate athletes participate in various European and international kyokushin championships, the Federation also hosts national level competitions and operates several kyokushin clubs throughout the country. The Federation has twice organized the "Kyokushin World Union European Championships" in Yerevan, the first in 2012 and the second in 2018, which was attended by over 700 athletes from 27 countries. The Federation is a full member of the International Kyokushin Karate Organization and the Kyokushin World Union, within the European Division.

See also
 Armenian Shotokan Karate Federation
 Karate Federation of Armenia
 Sport in Armenia

References

External links 
 Armenian Kyokushin Karate Federation official website
 Armenian Kyokushin Karate Federation on Facebook

Sports governing bodies in Armenia
Kyokushin kaikan
Karate in Armenia
Karate organizations